This is a list of people executed in Western Australia. It lists people who were executed by Dutch East India Company (VOC), British and, from 1901, Australian authorities within the modern-day boundaries of Western Australia. For people executed in other parts of Australia, see the sidebar.

Uniquely among Australian states, Western Australia is the site of several executions carried out by Europeans besides the British, namely the VOC. On 2 October 1629, seven crew members of the VOC ship  were hanged on Long Island in the Houtman Abrolhos for mutiny and the subsequent massacre of 125 passengers and crew.

Long Island, Houtman Abrolhos

 Jeronimus Corneliszoon - 2 October 1629 - Hanged as party to the murder of 125 men, women and children
 Lenert Michielsz - 2 October 1629 - Hanged as party to the murder of 125 men, women and children
 Mattys Beijr - 2 October 1629 - Hanged as party to the murder of 125 men, women and children
 Jan Hendricx - 2 October 1629 - Hanged as party to the murder of 125 men, women and children
 Allert Janssen - 2 October 1629 - Hanged as party to the murder of 125 men, women and children
 Rutger Fredericxsz - 2 October 1629 - Hanged as party to the murder of 125 men, women and children
 Andries Jonas - 2 October 1629 - Hanged as party to the murder of 125 men, women and children

Perth
 Mendik – 14 October 1841 – Hanged at the site of the crime for the murder of twelve-year-old John Burtenshaw on the Canning River at Maddington on 16 July 1839
 Buckas (a lascar) – January 1845 – Hanged at Perth for rape of a child under ten years of age
 Kanyin – 12 April 1850 – Hanged at Redcliffe for the murder of Yadupwert at York. This was the first public execution in Western Australia for inter se murder
 Edward Bishop - 12 October 1854 - Hanged at South Perth for the murder of Ah Chong, a chinaman, at York. Protested his innocence to the end. Three years later William Voss confessed to the crime. Voss was hanged in 1862 at Perth Gaol for the murder of his wife

Perth Gaol
People hanged (unless other means of execution is stated) at the Perth Gaol:

1830s to 1850s
 Midgegooroo – 22 May 1833 – Executed at the Perth Gaol by firing squad on a death warrant issued summarily by Lieutenant Governor Frederick Irwin, for the murders of Thomas and John Velvick at Bull's Creek on 31 March 1833
 Bridget Hurford – 15 October 1855 – for the murder of her husband John Hurford at Vasse
 William Dodd – 15 October 1855 – for the murder of John Hurford at Vasse
 George Williams – 15 October 1855 – for wounding Warder James McEvoy with a shovel at the Convict Establishment on 26 September 1855 
 John Scott – 14 January 1856 – for the murder of William Longmate at Vasse
 Daniel Lewis (Convict # 2972)- January 1857 - for the rape of Ellen Horton at Woorooloo
 John Lloyd – 29 October 1857 – for wounding with intent to kill John Brown at Port Gregory in June 1857
 Richard Bibbey – 17 October 1859 – for the murder of Billamarra at Upper Irwin in March 1859. First European executed for murder of an aboriginal in Western Australia

1860s
 Thomas Airey - 13 October 1860 - for the rape of five-year-old Lydia Farmer at Perth in July. Had been granted ticket-of-leave 4 June 1860.
 John Caldwell - 13 October 1860 - for rape and murder of an aboriginal girl at Champion Bay. A ticket-of-leave man.
 Thomas Clancy – 10 January 1861 – for the rape of seven-year-old Ellen Jane White at Bunbury
 Joseph McDonald – 10 January 1861 – for rape at Toodyay
 Robert Thomas Palin – 6 July 1861 – for robbery with violence of Susan Harding at Fremantle
 William Voss – 9 January 1862 – for the murder of his wife Mary Moir at York on 11 November 1861
 Kewacan (Larry) – 24 January 1862 – for the murder of Charles Storey at Jacup on 23 July 1861
 Long Jimmy – 24 January 1862 – for the murder of Charles Storey at Jacup on 23 July 1861 
 Narreen – 10 April 1862 – for the murder of an Indigenous girl called Nelly at Victoria Plains
 Eenue – 10 April 1862 – for the murder of an Indigenous girl called Nelly at Victoria Plains
 Finger – 10 April 1862 – for the murder of Charles Storey at Jacup on 23 July 1861
 Thomas Pedder – 21 March 1863 – for the murder of Thomas Sweeny, a shepherd, at Irwin River on 1 December 1862
 John Thomas – 8 September 1863 – for the murder of Duncan Urquhart at Peninsula Farm on 6 June 1863
 Joseph White – 21 October 1863 – for rape of 13 yo Jane Rhodes, at Greenough on 18 August 1863
 Teelup – 21 October 1863 – for the murder of Charles Storey at Jacup on 23 July 1861
 Narrigalt – 18 July 1865 – for the murder of Martha Farling, a 3 year-old 'half-caste' girl, near York on 26 May 1865
 Youndalt – 18 July 1865 – for the murder of Martha Farling, a 3 yo 'half-caste' girl, near York on 26 May 1865 
 Nandingbert – 18 July 1865 – for the murder of Quatcull near Albany on 14 May 1865
 Yardalgene (also called Jackey Howson) – 18 July 1865 – for the murder of Quatcull near Albany on 14 May 1865 
 Daniel Duffy - 11 January 1866 - an escaped convict, hanged for the murder of Edward Johnson on 5 November 1865 at Northam     
 Matthew Brooks - 11 January 1866 - an escaped convict, hanged for the murder of Edward Johnson on 5 November 1865 at Northam
 Bernard Wootton (also called MacNulty) - 8 October 1867 - an escaped convict, hanged for the attempted murder of Police Sgt. John Moye after his recapture at Murramine, near Beverley. Hanged at Perth Gaol.

1870s
 James Fanning – 14 April 1871 – for the rape of thirteen-year-old Mary Dawes on the Albany Road on 24 November 1870. The first private execution and the last execution for rape in the colony
 Margaret Cody – 15 July 1871 – for the murder of James Holditch, at North Fremantle on 4 March 1871
 William Davis – 15 July 1871 – for the murder of James Holditch, at North Fremantle on 4 March 1871
 Briley (Briarly) – 13 October 1871 – for the murder of Charley (Wickin) at Albany
 Noorbung – 13 October 1871 – for the murder of Margaret Mary McGowan at Boyanup on 30 June 1871
 Charcoal (Mullandaridgee) – 15 February 1872 – for the murder of Samuel Wells Lazenby at Port Walcott on 7 August 1871
 Tommy (Mullandee) – 15 February 1872 – for the murder of Samuel Wells Lazenby at Port Walcott on 7 August 1871
 Yarradeee – 16 October 1873 – for the murder and cannibalism of three-year-old Edward William Dunn at Yanganooka, Port Gregory on 5 October 1865
 Muregelly – 16 October 1873 – for the murder and cannibalism of three-year-old Edward William Dunn at Yanganooka, Port Gregory on 5 October 1865
 Robert Goswell – 13 January 1874 – for murder of Mary Anne Lloyd at Stapelford, Beverley on 1 December 1873
 John Gill – 4 April 1874 – hanged for the murder of William Foster at Narrogin on 13 February 1874
 Bobbinett – 22 April 1875 – for the murder of Police Lance-Corporal William Archibald Armstrong near Kojonup on 14 January 1875
 Wanaba (or Wallaby) – 22 April 1875 – for the murder of Tommy Howell (or Moul), a police native assistant, near Yalgoo on 10 July 1874
 Wandagary – 22 April 1875 – for the murder of Tommy Howell (or Moul), a police native assistant, near Yalgoo on 10 July 1874
 Kenneth Brown – 10 June 1876 – for the murder of his wife Mary Ann on 3 January 1876 at Geraldton
 Yarndu – 16 October 1876 
 Chilagorah – 29 April 1879 – for the murder of Pintagorah at Cossack on 31 January 1879

1880s
 Ah Kett – 27 January 1883 – for the murder of Foo Ah Moy, at Cheritah Station, Roebourne on 2 July 1883 
 John Collins – 27 January 1883 – for the murder of John King at the Kalgan River near Albany on 2 October 1882
 John Maroney – 25 October 1883 – for the murder of James Watson at Yellenup, Kojonup on 1 May 1883
 William Watkins – 25 October 1883 – for the murder of James Watson at Yellenup, Kojonup on 1 May 1883
 Henry Benjamin Haynes – 23 January 1884 – for the murder of his wife Mary Ann Haynes at Perth on 12 October 1883
 Thomas Henry Carbury – 23 October 1884 – for the murder of Constable Hackett at Beverley on 12 September 1884 
 John Duffy – 28 January 1885 – for the murder of his wife Mary Sultana McGann at Fremantle on 21 November 1884
 Henry Sherry – 27 October 1885 – for the murder of Catherine Waldock at Quinderring, Williams on 16 September 1885
 Franz Erdmann – 4 April 1887 – for the murder of Anthony Johnson at McPhee's Creek, Kimberley on 27 October 1886
 William Conroy – 18 November 1887 – for the murder of John Snook at Fremantle Town Hall on 23 June 1887

Victoria Park
 James Malcolm – 14 April 1847 – Hanged at the site of the crime, the Burswood Estate (Victoria Park), for highway robbery and murder of Clark Gordon on 6 January 1847
 Samuel Stanley – 18 April 1855 – Hanged at Victoria Park for the murder of Catherine Dayly on the York Road
 Jacob – 18 April 1855 – Hanged at Victoria Park for the murder of Bijare at Gingin on 25 September 1854
 Yoongal – 14 July 1855 – Hanged at Victoria Park for the murder of Kanip at the Hotham River
 Yandan – 14 July 1855 – Hanged at Victoria Park for the murder by spearing of a ten-year-old girl named Yangerdan near York

York

 Doodjeep – 7 July 1840 – Hanged in chains at the site of the crime, for the murders of Sarah Cook and her 8-month-old child on 18 May 1839 at Norrilong, York
 Barrabong – 7 July 1840 – Hanged in chains at the site of the crime for the murders of Sarah Cook and her 8-month-old child on 18 May 1839 at Norrilong, York

Fremantle

 John Gaven – 6 April 1844 – Hanged at the Round House for the murder of George Pollard at South Dandalup

Fremantle Prison
Hanged at Fremantle Prison:

1880s to 1890s
 Long Jimmy (alias Jimmy Long) – 2 March 1889 – A Malay, hanged for the murder of Claude Kerr on board the pearling lugger 'Dawn' at Cossack on 7 September 1888
 Ahle Pres (alias Harry Pres) – 8 November 1889 – A Singapore Malay, hanged for the murder of Louis, a Filipino, near Halls Creek, on 9 June 1889
 Ah Chi (alias Li Ki Hong) – 16 April 1891 – Hanged for the murder of Ah Gin at Daliak, York on 3 March 1891
 Chew Fong – 29 April 1892 – Hanged for the murder of Ah Pang at Meka Station on 23 Dec 1891
 Lyee Nyee – 29 April 1892 – Hanged for the murder of Ah Pang at Meka Station on 23 Dec 1891
 Yung Quonk (Young Quong) – 29 April 1892 – Hanged for the murder of Ah Pang at Meka Station on 23 Dec 1891
 Sin Cho Chi – 29 April 1892 – Hanged for the murder of George E.B Fairhead, at a Mill Stream out-station, near Roebourne
 Goulam Mahomet – 2 May 1896 – Hanged for the murder of Tagh Mahomet in the mosque at Coolgardie on 10 January 1896
 Jumna Khan – 31 March 1897 – Hanged for the murder of William Griffiths in High Street, Fremantle on 3 December 1896

1900s
 Pedro De La Cruz – 19 July 1900 – Hanged for the murder of Captain John Arthur Reddell of the brigantine Ethel, his 19-year-old son Leslie, the mate James Taylor, and two crew-members (Ando, who was Japanese, and Jimmy, who was Indigenous), at the La Grange Bay pearling grounds, near Broome, on 19 October 1899
 Peter Perez – 19 July 1900 – Hanged for the murder of Captain John Arthur Reddell of the brigantine Ethel, his 19-year-old son Leslie, the mate James Taylor, and two crew-members (Ando, who was Japanese, and Jimmy, who was Indigenous), at the La Grange Bay pearling grounds, near Broome, on 19 October 1899
 Samuel Peters – 9 September 1902 – Hanged for the murder of his wife Trevenna Peters at Leederville on 3 July 1903 
 Stelios Psichitas – 15 April 1903 – Greek national, hanged for the rape and murder of his sister-in-law Sophia Psichitas (nee Leadakis) and murder of his 4-month-old nephew Emanuel at Lawlers on 20 December 1902
 Fredric Maillat – 21 April 1903 – French national, hanged for the murder of Charles Lauffer, at Smith's Mill, Glen Forest, on 4 February 1903
 Sebaro Rokka – 7 July 1903 – Hanged for the murder of Dollah and another Malay at Point Cunningham, near Derby on 20 February 1903
 Ah Hook – 11 January 1904 – Hanged for the murder of Yanoo, a Japanese laundryman, at Carnarvon on 26 August 1903
 Manoor Mohomet – 4 May 1904 – Hanged for the murder of Meer, an Afghan, at Kensington, near Menzies on 16 November 1903
 Simeon Espada – 14 December 1905 – Hanged for the murder of Mark Lieblig at Broome on 30 August 1905
 Charles Hagen – 14 December 1905 – Hanged for the murder of Mark Lieblig at Broome on 30 August 1905
 Pablo Marquez – 14 December 1905 – Hanged for the murder of Mark Lieblig at Broome on 30 August 1905
 Antonio Sala – 19 November 1906 – Hanged for the murder of Battista Gregorini at Mt Jackson on 13 September 1906
 Augustin De Kitchilan – 23 October 1907 – Hanged for the murder of Leah Fouracre at Peppermint Grove Farm, Waroona on 15 or 16 August 1907 
 Harry G. Smith – 23 March 1908 – Hanged for the murder of William John Clinton at Day Dawn on 5 January 1908
 Iwakichi Oki – 22 October 1908 – Hanged for the murder of James Henry Shaw at West Murray, Pinjarra on 23 August 1908
 Martha Rendell – 6 October 1909 – Hanged for the murder of her 14-year-old stepson Arthur Morris by poisoning on 8 October 1908, suspected of killing two younger stepchildren

1910s to 1960s
 Peter Robustelli – 9 February 1910 – Hanged for the murder of Giovanni Forsatti in a lane between Bayley and Woodward streets, Coolgardie on 19 October 1909 
 Alexander Smart – 7 March 1911 – Hanged for the murder of Ethel May Harris at 5 Cowle Street, West Perth on 10 March 1910
 David H Smithson – 25 July 1911 – Hanged for the rape and murder of 18-year-old Elizabeth Frances Compton at Woodlupine on 13 May 1911
 Charles Spargo – 1 July 1913 – Hanged for the murder of Gilbert Pickering Jones at Broome on 23 January 1913
 Charles H. Odgers – 14 January 1914 – Hanged for the murder of Edith Molyneaux at Balgobin, Dandalup on 3 October 1913; also charged with murder of Richard Thomas Williams at Waroona on 14 September 1913
 Andrea Sacheri (alias Joseph Cutay) - 12 April 1915 – Hanged for the murder of 11-year-old Jean Bell at Marrinup, near Dwellingup, on 12 January 1915 
 Frank Matamin (alias Rosland) – 12 March 1923 – Hanged for the murder of Zareen at Nullagine on 27 August 1922
 Royston Rennie – 2 August 1926 – Hanged for the murder of John Roger Greville on the train between East Perth and Perth stations on 3 June 1926
 William Coulter – 25 October 1926 – Hanged for the murders of Inspector John Walsh and Sergeant Alexander Pitman near Boulder on 28 April 1926
 Phillip J. Trefene – 25 October 1926 – Hanged for the murders of Inspector John Walsh and Sergeant Alexander Pitman near Boulder on 28 April 1926
 John Sumpter Milner – 21 May 1928 – Hanged for the rape and murder of 11-year-old Ivy Lewis at Darkan on 28 February 1928
 Clifford Hulme – 3 September 1928 – Hanged for the murder of Harold Eaton Smith at Wubin on 22 June 1928
 Antonio Fanto – 18 May 1931 – Hanged for the murder of Cosimo Nesci (sometimes Nexi, Xesci) at Latham on 20 March 1931
 John Thomas Smith (Snowy Rowles) – 13 June 1932 – Hanged for the murder of Louis George Carron near the 183 mile gate on the No. 1 Rabbit-proof fence, near Youanmi, on or about 20 May 1930 
 Karol Tapci – 23 June 1952 – Hanged for the murder of Norman Alfred Perfect at Wubin on 17 March
 Robert Jeremiah Thomas – 18 July 1960 – Hanged for the murder of taxi-driver Keith Mervyn Campbell Wedd at Claremont on 22 June 1959. Also charged with the murder of John and Kaye O'Hara in Jimbell St, Mosman Park.
 Mervyn Fallows – 6 June 1961 – Hanged for the rape and murder of 11-year-old Sandra Dorothea Smith at North Beach on or before 29 December 1960
 Brian William Robinson – 20 January 1964 – Hanged for the murder of Constable Noel Ileson at Belmont on 9 February 1963
 Eric Edgar Cooke – 26 October 1964 – Hanged for murder of John Lindsay Sturkey at Nedlands on 27 January 1963

Mullewa

 Wangayackoo – 28 January 1865 - Hanged at Butterabby, the site of the crime, for the spearing of Thomas Bott
 Yermakarra – 28 January 1865 - Hanged at Butterabby, the site of the crime, for the spearing of Thomas Bott
 Garolee – 28 January 1865 - Hanged at Butterabby, the site of the crime, for the spearing of Thomas Bott
 Charlakarra – 28 January 1865 - Hanged at Butterabby, the site of the crime, for the spearing of Thomas Bott
 Williakarra – 28 January 1865 - Hanged at Butterabby, the site of the crime, for the spearing of Thomas Bott

Kellerberrin

 Ngowee - 19 January 1866 - For the murder of Edward Clarkson on 21 August 1865, hanged at the site of the crime, at Dalbercuttin, near Kellerberrin
 Egup (Condor) - 21 April 1866 - For the murder of Edward Clarkson on 21 August 1865, hanged at the site of the crime, at Dalbercuttin, near Kellerberrin

Albany

 Peter McKean (alias William McDonald) – 12 October 1872 – Hanged for the murder of William "Yorkie" Marriott on 30 June 1872 at Slab Hut Gully (Tunney), between Kojonup and Cranbrook

Rottnest

 Tampin – 16 July 1879 – Hanged for the murder of John Moir at Stokes Inlet on 29 March 1877
 Wangabiddi – 18 Jun 1883 – Hanged for the murder of Charles Redfern at Minni-Minni on the Gascoyne River in May 1882
 Guerilla – 18 June 1883 – Hanged for the murder of Anthony Cornish at Fitzroy River on 12 December 1882
 Naracorie – 3 August 1883 – Hanged for the murder of Charles Brackell at Wandagee on the Minilya River on 31 July 1882
 Calabungamarra – 13 June 1888 – Hanged for the murder of a Chinese man, Indyco, at Hamersley Range

Geraldton

 Sing Ong – 29 October 1884 – Hanged for the murder of Chung Ah Foo on 11 May 1884 at Shark Bay

Halls Creek

 Tomahawk – 18 March 1892 – Hanged at Mount Dockerell, the site of the crime, for the murder of William Miller on 26 June 1891
 Dicky – 18 March 1892 – Hanged at Mount Dockerell, the site of the crime, for the murder of William Miller on 26 June 1891
 Chinaman (Jerringo) – 18 March 1892 – Hanged at Mount Dockerell, the site of the crime, for the murder of William Miller on 26 June 1891

Roebourne

 Cooperabiddy – 20 March 1893 – Hanged for murder of James Coppin, described as a 'half-caste', at the Hamersley Ranges
 Doulga – 28 December 1896 – Hanged for the murder of John Horrigan at Lagrange Bay on 28 March 1896 
 Caroling – 14 May 1900 – Hanged for the murder of Dr Edward Vines at Braeside station
 Poeling – 14 May 1900 – Hanged for the murder of Dr Edward Vines at Braeside station
 Weedabong – 14 May 1900 – Hanged for the murder of Dr Edward Vines at Braeside station

Derby

 Lillimara – 21 October 1899 – hanged at Derby Gaol for murder of Thomas Jasper on 17 March 1897 on Oscar Range Station, Fitzroy Crossing
 Mullabudden – 12 May 1900 – hanged at Derby Gaol for murder of John Dobbie on 12 March 1899 at Mount Broome
 Woolmillamah – 12 May 1900 – hanged at Derby Gaol for murder of John Dobbie on 12 March 1899 at Mount Broome

References

Further reading 
 Purdue, Brian Legal Executions in Western Australia, Foundation Press, Victoria Park, WA, 1993. 
 Heaton, J.H. Australian Dictionary of Dates and Men of the Time, S.W. Silver & Son, London, 1879. Part 2, pages 90–94.

Australian crime-related lists
Executed
Australia
 
Executions
Executions
executed